Eukaryotic translation initiation factor 3 subunit A (eIF3a) is a protein that in humans is encoded by the EIF3A gene. It is one of the subunits of Eukaryotic initiation factor 3 (eIF3) a multiprotein complex playing major roles in translation initiation in eukaryotes.

Interactions 

EIF3A has been shown to interact with:

 DISC1, 
 EIF3B, 
 EIF3C, 
 EIF3D, 
 EIF3EIP, 
 EIF3F, 
 EIF3G, 
 EIF3H, 
 EIF3I 
 EIF3J, 
 EIF3K,
 EIF3S6, 
 EIF4B, 
 EIF4G2,  and
 FBXO32.

See also 
Eukaryotic initiation factor 3 (eIF3)

References

Further reading